Mirificarma cytisella is a moth of the family Gelechiidae. It is found from most of Europe (except Ireland, Great Britain, Fennoscandia, the Baltic region and part of the Balkan Peninsula) to the Ural Mountains.

The wingspan is 6–8 mm for males and 6-7.5 mm for females. The head is white to cream. The forewings are white to cream, mottled, sometimes sparsely, with brown scales. Adults are on wing from April to September.

The larvae feed on Cytisus nigricans, Genista, Calicotome spinosa, Ononis spinosa and possibly Laburnum anagyroides. They feed mostly from within two or three spun leaves, but sometimes the larva spins two leaves upon each other and partially mines them, resulting in a fleck type mine. Larvae can be found in June, September and October.

Subspecies
Mirificarma cytisella cytisella
Mirificarma cytisella leonella Amsel, 1959 (Portugal)

References

Moths described in 1833
Mirificarma
Moths of Europe